The Men's Downhill B2 was one of the events held in Alpine skiing at the 1988 Winter Paralympics in Innsbruck.

There were 14 competitors in the final.

Austria's Odo Habermann set a time of 48.84, taking the gold medal.

Results

Final

References 

Downhill